Rising Tide Charter Public School is a middle and high school in Plymouth, Massachusetts, United States that was founded in 1998.

References

External links

Educational institutions established in 1998
Buildings and structures in Plymouth, Massachusetts
Charter schools in Massachusetts
Schools in Plymouth County, Massachusetts
Public high schools in Massachusetts
1998 establishments in Massachusetts